Josip Kokail  was a politician of the late 18th and early 19th century in Slovenia, when the country was under the Holy Roman Empire. He became mayor of Ljubljana in 1797 and became the second-longest-serving mayor in the history of the city, serving a term of 15 years. He was succeeded by Anton Codelli in 1812.

References 

Year of birth missing
Year of death missing
18th-century Carniolan people
19th-century Carniolan people
Mayors of places in the Holy Roman Empire
Mayors of Ljubljana